Tezacitabine is a ribonucleotide reductase inhibitor. It is a synthetic purine nucleoside analogue with potential antineoplastic activity. It is used in synthetic DNA.

References

Nucleosides
Organofluorides
Pyrimidones